The Fundamental Law of Hungary, the country's constitution, was adopted by parliament on 18 April 2011, promulgated by the president a week later and entered into force on 1 January 2012. It is Hungary's first constitution adopted within a democratic framework and following free elections. 

The document succeeded the 1949 Constitution, originally adopted at the creation of the Hungarian People's Republic on 20 August 1949 and heavily amended on 23 October 1989. The 1949 Constitution was Hungary's first permanent written constitution and until it was replaced, the country was the only former Eastern Bloc nation without an entirely new constitution after the end of Communism.

Both domestically and abroad, the 2011 constitution has been the subject of controversy. Among the claims critics make are that it was adopted without sufficient input from the opposition and society at large, that it reflects the ideology of the ruling Fidesz party, and enshrines it in office, that it is rooted in a conservative Christian worldview despite Hungary not being a particularly devout country, and that it curtails and politicizes previously independent institutions. The government that enacted the charter has dismissed such assertions, saying it was enshrined lawfully and reflects the popular will.

Contents

The Fundamental Law is divided into sections and articles as outlined below.

Overview 

Described as socially and fiscally conservative, the constitution initiates a number of changes. In an effort to push the public debt below 50% of gross domestic product (from above 80% at the time of adoption), the powers of the Constitutional Court on budget and tax matters are restricted until debt falls below 50%. The President is allowed to dissolve Parliament if a budget is not approved, and only companies with transparent activities and ownership structures are allowed to bid for government contracts. The powers of the head of the Hungarian National Bank are also limited, and the modification of tax and pension laws requires a two-thirds majority. The life of a fetus is protected from the moment of conception, and although the move is seen as opening the possibility for a future ban or restrictions on abortion, existing laws were unaffected. Same-sex couples may legally register their partnerships, but marriage is defined as being between one man and one woman. A ban on discrimination does not mention age or sexual orientation, and the constitution allows life imprisonment for violent crimes without the possibility of parole.

The constitution lowers judges' mandatory retirement age from 70 to the general retirement age, which was 62 at the time of adoption and is set to rise to 65 by 2022. The provision also covers prosecutors but exempts the Prosecutor General and the head of Hungary's highest court, the Curia. The country's name is changed from "Hungarian Republic" to "Hungary" but the country remains a republic. The preamble of the constitution contains references to the Holy Crown, God, Christianity, the fatherland and traditional family values. Laws affecting areas such as family policy, the pension system and taxation can be altered only through special legislation (cardinal acts) passed by a two-thirds majority of Parliament and are not subject to constitutional review.

History

Background

For centuries, the Hungarian constitution was unwritten, based upon customary law. There was no civil code either; lawyers worked with the Corpus Iuris Hungarici. Among the laws that acquired constitutional force were a series of liberal statutes enacted during the 1848 Revolution; Statute XII of 1867 (enacting the Ausgleich); and further guarantees for constitutionalism, such as Statute IV of 1869, separating the executive and the judiciary; or the post-1870 statutes regulating local self-government and state administration.

Following the advent of the Hungarian Soviet Republic, the Revolutionary Governing Council adopted a Provisional Constitution on 2 April 1919, providing for a Soviet-style political system. On 23 June, the National Assembly of Allied Councils adopted Hungary's first charter-like constitution, the Constitution of the Socialist Allied Council Republic of Hungary. However, that regime was crushed two months later and Hungary returned to its historical, unwritten pre-1918 constitution.

Despite the lack of a written constitution, several constitutional laws were passed during the interwar period of the Kingdom of Hungary. Statute I of 1920 confirmed the monarchical form of government (albeit with a vacant throne, the king's powers being exercised by regent Miklós Horthy and his ministers) and vested legislative power in the diet. Statute XLVII dethroned the Habsburg-Lorraine dynasty. A second chamber was established by Statute XXII of 1926. Successive constitutional acts increased the power of the regent, who was empowered to nominate forty senators at first, and during World War II, eighty-seven.

1949 Constitution

In August 1949, with the Hungarian Working People's Party in complete control of the country, a constitution based on the 1936 Soviet Constitution was adopted, the party's leading role enshrined in the document. Its basic features remained in place until 1989, although a number of important amendments were made, including one in 1972 that proclaimed Hungary a socialist state. While the constitution guaranteed certain fundamental rights, their scope was limited by provisions stating they had to be exercised in harmony with the interests of the socialist society.

In 1989, as the Communist regime ended, the legislature overwhelmingly approved nearly a hundred changes to the constitution which purged the document's Communist character. Hungary was now defined as a civil democratic and constitutional republic that respected "the values of both bourgeois democracy and democratic socialism." After the opposition won free elections in 1990, references to democratic socialism and the planned economy were dropped. Further modifications followed over the ensuing two decades, as successive plans for a new constitution did not reach fulfillment.

2011 Constitution

Drafting process
In 2010, a new government led by Fidesz initiated a drafting process for a new constitution. A parliamentary committee for drafting the constitution was set up, with all five parliamentary parties represented; the draft was composed on the iPad of József Szájer, then a member of the European Parliament. The following February, a body responsible for national consultations on a draft was set up by Szájer; its members included János Csák, Hungarian ambassador to the United Kingdom; Zsigmond Járai, chairman of the supervisory board of the National Bank; József Pálinkás, president of the Hungarian Academy of Sciences and former Minister of Education; and Katalin Szili, former Hungarian Socialist Party Speaker of the National Assembly. The consultation involved questionnaires being mailed out to all citizens for their opinions; some 917,000 or 11% were returned. Provisions were then included or excluded based on consensus among respondents; for instance, a proposal to adopt voting rights for minors was shelved after citizens expressed disapproval.

The following April 18, Parliament approved the constitution by the required two-thirds majority, on a 262-44 vote, with Fidesz and their Christian Democrat coalition partners in favor and Jobbik opposed. The Hungarian Socialist Party and Politics Can Be Different (LMP), citing the ruling party's unwillingness to compromise on issues and their inability to change the outcome, boycotted both the drafting process and the vote. On April 25, President Pál Schmitt signed the document into law, and it entered into force on the first day of 2012. The enactment came halfway through Hungary's six-month Presidency of the Council of the European Union.

Domestic reactions and subsequent developments
According to Fidesz parliamentary group chairman János Lázár, the constitution marks a break with Hungary’s communist past, while Prime Minister Viktor Orbán said it completes a transition to democracy and allows for sound finances and clean government after years of mismanagement and scandals. However, the opposition accused Fidesz of using its two-thirds majority in Parliament to push through its own constitution without cross-party consensus. Prior to and during the vote to adopt the constitution, thousands of protesters demonstrated in Budapest against its adoption; among their complaints are that it is an attempt by the government to cement its power beyond its term, force its Christian ideology on the country and limit civil liberties. Lack of opposition participation was also mentioned, but Deputy Prime Minister Tibor Navracsics responded that other parties were invited to participate but refused. Members of the Hungarian business community mentioned possible future difficulties in adopting the euro, noting a provision that enshrines the forint as legal tender. However, a government official said that, if the two-thirds majority to change this provision could not be attained, it could be circumvented by other means, such as a referendum.

One section of the preamble criticized by some historians as well as by the head of Hungary's Jewish community is the statement that the country lost its independence when it was invaded and occupied by Nazi Germany in March 1944. They asserted that the provision implies the state was not responsible for the ensuing deportation of Jews to extermination camps as part of the Holocaust and that it could affect future restitution claims.  Historian Géza Jeszenszky strongly rejected criticism of the passage, saying the loss of Hungarian sovereignty in March 1944 due to foreign invasion is simply a historical fact that should not be denied. In its support, he also mentioned Germany's direct intervention into Hungarian politics, such as the arrest of cabinet members and of anti-German politicians. Socialist leader Attila Mesterházy denounced what he called "Fidesz's party constitution" and promised to change the constitution "on the basis of a national consensus" following the next elections. László Sólyom, former President of Hungary and of the Constitutional Court, is a critic of limits imposed on the court and of the "common parliamentary wrangling" through which the charter was adopted. 

The day after New Year's Day 2012, the government held a gala celebration at the Hungarian State Opera House to mark the entry into force of the constitution. Outside on Andrássy út, tens of thousands of people protested the occasion, with opponents claiming the constitution threatens democracy by removing checks and balances. Demonstrators included representatives from various civil groups and opposition parties, among them the Socialists. Fidesz MP Gergely Gulyás, who helped write the constitution, responded to critics by saying that it improves the legal framework of life in Hungary.

International reactions
The Venice Commission and the Hungarian Helsinki Committee expressed concern over the provision on cardinal acts; opposition parties asserted these could bind future governments to Fidesz' actions, but did promise to participate in the debate on the acts. Amnesty International believes the document "violates international and European human rights standards", citing the clauses on fetal protection, marriage and life imprisonment, and sexual orientation not being covered in the anti-discrimination clause. Left-wing and liberal members of the European Parliament asserted that it fails to protect citizens' rights and reduces legislative checks and balances. Among these was Guy Verhofstadt, head of the Alliance of Liberals and Democrats for Europe, who said the constitution could limit "fundamental human rights" and was adopted without transparency, flexibility, a spirit of compromise and sufficient time for debate. Werner Hoyer, Germany's deputy foreign minister, expressed his country's concern as well, prompting the Hungarian Foreign Affairs Ministry to dismiss the remarks as "inexplicable and unacceptable". Additionally, United Nations Secretary-General Ban Ki-moon suggested the government should address concerns about the constitution.

In neighboring Slovakia, which has a significant Hungarian minority, at least three parties, including the governing Slovak Democratic and Christian Union, expressed concern about clauses that afford certain rights to ethnic Hungarians abroad, including the right to dual citizenship and the right to vote, and critics there fear that the move has expansive and nationalist objectives. Slovakia's Foreign Affairs Ministry stated that it would oppose any other country’s infringement of the Slovak Constitution, its sovereignty or the rights of its citizens. In response, Foreign Minister János Martonyi assured his Slovak counterpart that the constitution has no extraterritorial effect.

2013 amendments 

In March 2013, Parliament amended the constitution for the fourth time, on a 265-11 vote, with Fidesz, the Christian Democrats and three independents in favor and the Socialists boycotting the vote; there were also 33 abstentions. Subsequently, President János Áder signed the amendment into law, citing his legal duty and the need to preserve national unity. The fifteen-page amendment touches on several aspects. It annuls rulings of the Constitutional Court made before the 2011 constitution went into force, while allowing their legal effects to remain. It endows the president of the Curia and the chief prosecutor with the power to initiate constitutional review of laws. While giving the Constitutional Court the power to review the constitution itself on procedural grounds, it stipulates that the court cannot annul a law passed by a two-thirds parliamentary majority. Judges and prosecutors are obliged to retire at the general retirement age, although that age is left unstated; the Curia head and the chief prosecutor are exempt. The amendment enshrines freedom of religion and allows constitutional complaints regarding the church law. It allows civil lawsuits for hate speech targeting an individual's community, and declares that communism is condemned. The measure requires students whose education is subsidized by the state to work in Hungary for a period after graduation or reimburse their tuition costs to the state. It allows only public media to air political advertising prior to general and European elections. The importance of the traditional family is stressed, and authorities are empowered to ban living in certain public spaces, although homelessness is not outlawed. A prior proposal on requiring voters to register prior to elections was not included after being earlier voided by the Constitutional Court.

The amendment drew criticism both within Hungary and abroad. The Socialist floor leader labeled the measure an attempt to restrict the Constitutional Court's powers, and party members hung black flags from the Hungarian Parliament Building's windows, in sign of mourning for democracy. The LMP charged that the government was "dismantling constitutional values", while former prime minister Ferenc Gyurcsány, head of the small Democratic Coalition, also drew attention to the diminution in the court's prerogatives. A protest in Budapest held in the days before parliamentary approval was given drew several thousands, while on the day of the vote, a few hundred turned out. José Manuel Barroso, President of the European Commission, and Thorbjørn Jagland, Secretary General of the Council of Europe, together raised concerns about the amendment's impact on the rule of law, while prominent EU politicians, including Verhofstadt and Martin Schulz, expressed more forceful criticism. Orbán denied that the powers of the Constitutional Court had been curtailed, challenging critics to explain just how the amendment is undemocratic, while his party explained that the measure was needed in order to delineate the new constitution from the previous one.

That September, a fifth amendment was passed in response to recommendations from the Constitutional Court, the European Commission and the Venice Commission. Approved by Fidesz parliamentarians, it was opposed by LMP and the Socialists, while Jobbik abstained. The provision granted the National Bank oversight of financial markets; eliminated a provision allowing judicial cases to be transferred from one court to another, as well as one allowing taxes to be raised for financing fines charged to the Hungarian state by international court rulings; clarified the recognition of religious communities and allowed political campaign ads to be aired on public as well as commercial television and radio free of charge. Following the amendment's adoption, Jagland praised government efforts to address international criticism.

Notes

References

 Dupré, Catherine. Importing the Law in Post-communist Transitions (2003), Hart Publishing, 
 Harmathy, Attila (ed.). Introduction to Hungarian Law (1998), Kluwer Law International, 
 Körösényi, András. Government and Politics in Hungary (2000), Central European University Press, 
 Ludwikowski, Rett R. Constitution-making in the Region of Former Soviet Dominance (1996), Duke University Press, 
 Mezhikovskii, S. M. et al. Law and Religion in Post-Communist Europe (2003), Peeters Publishers, 
 Mullerson, Rein et al. Constitutional Reform and International Law in Central and Eastern Europe (1998), Martinus Nijhoff Publishers, 
 Rakowska-Harmstone, Teresa. Communism in Eastern Europe (1984), Indiana University Press, 
 Somody, Bernadette. "Raising the Standard? The Current Challenges in Human Rights Protection in Hungary" (2013), in Constitutional Evolution in Central and Eastern Europe, ed. Alexander H E Morawa, Kyriaki Topidi, Ashgate Publishing, 
 Szikinger, István. "Hungary's Pliable Constitution" (2001) in Democratic Consolidation in Eastern Europe: Institutional Engineering, ed. Jan Zielonka, Oxford University Press,

External links

  Constitutional background, with full list of amendments from 1989 to 2003
  1949 Constitution, with amendments through 2011
  Act XXXI of 1989
  Text of the Fundamental Law of Hungary (as in force on 1 January 2023)
  English translation of the Fundamental Law of Hungary (as in force on 1 January 2023)
  Opinion of the Venice Commission on the 2011 constitution
  Resolution of the European Parliament on the 2011 constitution
   Text of the Fourth Amendment

2011 in law
Hungary
Government of Hungary
2011 in Hungary
Politics of Hungary
Law of Hungary
Legal history of Hungary